Božidar Pavićević (9 January 1932 – 13 July 2004) was a Serbian-Yugoslavian actor. He appeared in more than one hundred films from 1955 to 1997.

Selected filmography

References

External links 

1932 births
2004 deaths
Male actors from Sarajevo
Serbs of Bosnia and Herzegovina
Serbian male film actors